Simeon Hristov (born 4 September 1992) is a Macedonian footballer who plays as a forward.

Career

Vllaznia
In January 2020, Hristov signed with Albanian club Vllaznia on a free transfer. He made his debut in official competition for the club on 21 January 2020, starting in a 2–0 home victory over Flamurtari. Hristov would make just four more competitive appearances for the club before departing, appearing in league matches against Laçi, Bylis, and Teuta Durrës, alongside a Cup appearance against Flamurtari.

References

External links

Simeon Hristov at SofaScore
Simeon Hristov at Eurosport

1992 births
Living people
FK Vardar players
Egri FC players
FK Pelister players
FK Bregalnica Štip players
FK Teteks players
FK Borec players
KF Vllaznia Shkodër players
FK Tikvesh players
Macedonian First Football League players
Nemzeti Bajnokság II players
Kategoria Superiore players
Macedonian footballers
North Macedonia under-21 international footballers
Macedonian expatriate footballers
Association football forwards
Southern Myanmar F.C. players